Isaac Scliar  is an Argentine retired  football striker.

Career
Scliar began his career in 1939 with Argentino de Quilmes. He moved to Club Atlético Atlanta and Newell's Old Boys over the next two seasons. He then joined Vélez Sársfield where he played until 1949. He finished his career by playing with Boca Juniors, Tigre and Quilmes until 1951. He was the third highest goal scorer in the 1949 season, tallying 20 goals for Vélez Sársfield, Boca Juniors and Tigre.

Scliar endured relegation from the Argentine top flight with Argentinos Juniors, Tigre and Quilmes.

References

External links
 Isaac Scliar at BDFA.com.ar 

Year of birth missing
Possibly living people
Jewish Argentine sportspeople
Jewish footballers
Argentine Jews
Argentine footballers
Association football goalkeepers
Argentinos Juniors footballers
Club Atlético Atlanta footballers
Newell's Old Boys footballers
Club Atlético Vélez Sarsfield footballers
Boca Juniors footballers
Club Atlético Tigre footballers
Quilmes Atlético Club footballers